is a national university in Hamamatsu, Shizuoka, Japan, founded in 1974.

External links
 Official website

Educational institutions established in 1974
Japanese national universities
Universities and colleges in Shizuoka Prefecture
Medical schools in Japan
Buildings and structures in Hamamatsu